Nationality words link to articles with information on the nation's poetry or literature (for instance, Irish or France).

Events
 May 6 – American colonial poet Anne Bradstreet becomes a founding mother of Andover Parish (modern-day North Andover), Massachusetts.
 English clergyman, poet and dramatist Jasper Mayne is made a Doctor of Divinity.

Works published
 Guillaume Colletet, Le Banquet des Poètes
 Richard Crashaw, Steps to the Temple: Sacred poems, with other delights of the muses (expanded edition 1648)
 Jean Ogier de Gombauld, Poésies
 Martin Lluelyn, Men-Miracles: With other poemes
 John Milton, Poems of Mr John Milton, Both English and Latin (see below)
 James Shirley, Poems
 Sir John Suckling, Fragmenta Aurea, works, including letters, poems and plays
 Henry Vaughan, Poems, with the Tenth Satyre of Juvenal Englished
 George Wither, Opobalsamum Anglicanum

Milton's Poems

 John Milton, Poems of Mr. John Milton both English and Latin, compos'd at several times; published this year, although the book states 1645; the volume's frontispiece contains an extremely unflattering portrait of Milton by the engraver William Marshall, under which Milton placed satirical verses in Greek denying any resemblance (see revised edition, 1673); the volume includes these poems:
On the Morning of Christ's Nativity
A Paraphrase on Psalm 114
Psalm 136
The Passion an ode possibly written in 1630; it connects Christ's Crucifixion with his Incarnation; linked to two other poems of Milton: On the Morning of Christ's Nativity and Upon the Circumcision
On Time
Upon the Circumcision
At A Solemn Musick
An Epitaph on the Marchioness of Winchester
Song on May Morning
On Shakespeare
On the University Carrier [Hobson's Epitaph]
Another on the Same
L'Allegro
Il Penseroso
Sonnets 1-10
Arcades
Lycidas
A Mask [Comus]

Births
Death years link to the corresponding "[year] in poetry" article:
 February 4 – Hans Erasmus Aßmann (died 1699), German statesman and poet
 March 19 – Michael Kongehl (died 1710), German baroque poet
 Pan Lei (died 1708), Chinese Qing dynasty scholar and poet
 Benedetto Menzini (died 1704), Italian Roman Catholic priest and poet

Deaths
Birth years link to the corresponding "[year] in poetry" article:
 December 28 – François Maynard (born 1582), French poet

See also

 Poetry
 17th century in poetry
 17th century in literature
 Cavalier poets in England, who supported the monarch against the puritans in the English Civil War

Notes

17th-century poetry
Poetry